Xi’an Jiaotong-Liverpool University (XJTLU) is an international joint venture university based in Suzhou, Jiangsu, China. It was founded in 2006 as a partnership between the University of Liverpool and Xi'an Jiaotong University, and it is the first Sino-British joint venture between research-led universities.

XJTLU primarily focuses on science, technology, engineering, architecture, and business, with a secondary focus on English language study. It is recognised by the Chinese Ministry of Education as a “non-profit” educational institution.

Undergraduate students at XJTLU earn two degrees: an XJTLU degree from the Chinese Ministry of Education and a globally recognised degree from the University of Liverpool. Postgraduate students receive a University of Liverpool degree that is recognised by the Chinese Ministry of Education. Most of the lessons are taught in English.

XJTLU is ranked #1001-1200 in the QS World University Rankings 2023 and is known as one of the top private universities in mainland China.

History

On September 28, 2004, Xi’an Jiaotong University and the University of Liverpool signed a cooperative agreement to set up XJTLU. Construction on the new university's campus started in August 2005 and the university was officially inaugurated on May 29, 2006.

More than 160 undergraduates enrolled in the first year. This number has increased to a total of 9,000 students on campus and a further 3,000 at the University of Liverpool on "2+2 programmes".

XJTLU's first batch of students graduated in August 2010 with 97 percent continuing their studies overseas on masters or doctorate programmes, ten percent of whom went to study at universities ranked in the world’s top ten (based on the University Ranking Chart by The Times, 2010). December 2010 saw XJTLU invest six million RMB in research for academic performance. By January 2011, XJTLU headed the list of Top 10 Sino-Foreign Cooperative universities in China.

In a visit to the University on 25 September 2016 UK Minister of State for Universities, Science, Research and Innovation Jo Johnson MP called XJTLU an "extraordinary achievement".

Funding
The government company Suzhou Education District Investigation (SIPEDI) has funded much of XJTLU's development and continues to play a large role in its success. SIPEDI has already spent around 130 billion RMB on XJTLU, mainly on funding facilities such as buildings and laboratories.

Context
A number of British universities have set up satellite campuses and joint ventures in China, including the University of Nottingham Ningbo China (UNNC), an overseas campus of the University of Nottingham situated in the city of Ningbo, and the Surrey International Institute-DUFE, an academic partnership institution between University of Surrey and Dongbei University of Finance and Economics (DUFE) in Dalian.

In 2010–2011, China was the third most popular destination for UK TNE students, after Malaysia and Singapore: and there are almost 36,000 UK TNE students in China.

American universities have also sought a presence in China. New York University Shanghai (NYU Shanghai) is the third degree-granting campus established by New York University, after New York City and Abu Dhabi, established in 2012 in partnership with East China Normal University of Shanghai.

However, such strategies have proven controversial. A 2007 report, edited by Anna Fazackerley, cautioned British universities that they must acquire a more thorough understanding of Chinese higher education policy if they were to succeed in building successful strategic alliances over the long-term.

Campus

Location
The campus is situated in 111 Renai Road, Suzhou Dushu Lake Science and Education Innovation District in Suzhou Industrial Park, 12 km east of the center of Suzhou, and 90 km west of Shanghai. Suzhou Industrial Park is home to more than 20,000 expatriate workers. Situated in the heart of the complex, Xi’an Jiaotong-Liverpool University forms part of that international community. The new XJTLU campus was constructed in the city of Taicang.

North Campus
Its campus has been developed in two phases. The first phase focused on the North Campus, which was completed in autumn 2013. The overall campus plan was designed by the American architecture firm Perkins+Will. The University's iconic Central Building was inaugurated in autumn 2013 and designed by the British-Asian architecture firm Aedas. It was nominated in the 2014 World Architecture Festival.

South Campus

The second development phase focuses on the South Campus, where building started in summer 2013. The first phase of the South Campus was opened to the public on 26 July 2016, as a major part of the University’s 10th anniversary celebrations. Architecturally it contrasts the North Campus and features modern designs that complement the surrounding area. British architects BDP were responsible for the design of the South Campus.

Taicang Campus 
Taicang Campus is located in the Taicang High-Tech Development Zone, north-east of Suzhou.

XJTLU Learning Mall 
Physically located at Taicang Campus; Online as university's VLE

Leadership
XJTLU’s Board of Directors oversees the University’s governance and the senior management team leads the strategic direction and day-to-day operations. In August 2008 Professor Xi Youmin, a scholar in management, was appointed as the Executive President of Xi’an Jiaotong-Liverpool University. He is also Pro-Vice-Chancellor of the University of Liverpool.

Academics
XJTLU offers a range of degree programmes including bachelor's degrees, master's degrees and Ph.D.

The Department of Architecture's undergraduate degree programme BEng Architecture is validated by the Royal Institute of British Architects (RIBA) for RIBA part I. The Master of Architectural Design MArchDes has been validated at Part 2 level by the Royal Institute of British Architects (RIBA) in 2016. The Department of Biological Sciences' undergraduate BSc Bio Sciences is accredited by the Royal Society of Biology (RSB).

The International Business School Suzhou (IBSS) at XJTLU was established in January 2013 by Professor Sarah Dixon, currently has eight undergraduate programmes and eleven postgraduate programmes in the fields of management, economics, finance, accounting, finance and business. IBSS has received accreditation from the Association to Advance Collegiate Schools of Business (AACSB) and in June 2018 became the youngest business school to be accredited by EFMD Quality Improvement System (EQUIS). It also has ACCA, CIMA, CPA Australia and ICAEW accreditation and recognition.

Awards 
In December 2011, XJTLU was given the title of Most Influential Sino-Foreign Higher Education Institution in China at the Fourth China Education Annual Gala.

Since the foundation of the Department of Architecture at Xi'an Jiaotong Liverpool University (XJTLU) in 2011, its students have won a number of important awards, including 
a third prize in the CTBUH Tall Building Student Design Competition. Architecture students were awarded already four times at the IDEERS Earthquake Safe Design Competition in Taiwan,  and twice at the National Architectural Education Symposium, at which annually the best design studio works from schools of architecture across China are awarded.

Research
Research centers have been established at XJTLU to support research and development. In cooperation with Suzhou Industrial Park, the local government has funded XJTLU 10 million RMB annually for research.

International students
In 2016, there are around 500 international students at the university. To encourage students from the University of Liverpool to spend time studying at the XJTLU campus, the Year in China programme allows undergraduate students to spend one year at XJTLU, following XJTLU's BA China Studies degree classes. XJTLU also has a number of opportunities for visiting and exchange students from universities around the world.

Notable people
 Youmin Xi - Professor and Current Executive President of XJTLU
 Yimin Ding - Current Vice-President of XJTLU
 James Drummond Bone - Professor and former Vice-Chair of the Board at XJTLU; XJTLU founding University of Liverpool Board member 
 Howard Newby - Professor and former Vice-chairman of the board at XJTLU
 Janet Beer - Professor and former Vice-chair of the board at XJTLU
 David Sadler (geographer) - Former Vice-president (Academic) of XJTLU
 Andre Brown - Former Vice-President for Academic Affairs of XJTLU
 David S. G. Goodman - Professor, former vice-president of academic affairs, and former head of the Department of China Studies at XJTLU
 Sarah Dixon - Professor and former dean of International Business School Suzhou

 Dr Theo Dounas - Honorary Research Fellow, co-editor and author of Blockchain for Construction, co-director of the innovation hub of XJTLU

References

Educational institutions established in 2006
Universities and colleges in Suzhou
Architecture schools in China
Xi'an Jiaotong University
University of Liverpool
Suzhou Industrial Park
Engineering universities and colleges in China
Business schools in China
2006 establishments in China